The Son of the White Mountain (German: Der Sohn der weißen Berge) is a 1930 German mystery romance film directed by Mario Bonnard and Luis Trenker and starring Trenker, Maria Matray and Renate Müller. It was part of the popular series of Mountain films of the era. A separate French-language version was also released.

Cast
 Luis Trenker as Hans Turri 
 Maria Matray as Anni 
 Renate Müller as Mary Dulac 
 Michael von Newlinsky as Gregor Milacz 
 Karl Steiner as Koste 
 Emmerich Albert as Morel 
 Sophie Pagay as Frau Turri, mother 
 Leo Peukert as M. Dulac 
 Jim Gérald as Desk Clerk 
 Marcel Merminod as Police Commissioner Frank 
 Felix Bressart as Jailer 
 Berthe Ostyn as Susanne Milacz 
 Hellmut Lantschner as Skier in Race Seq. 
 Ludwig Lantschner as Skier in Race Seq.

References

Bibliography
 Hoffmann, Hilmar. The Triumph of Propaganda: Film and National Socialism, 1933–1945, Volume 1. Berghahn Books, 1997.

External links

1930 films
Films of the Weimar Republic
1930 mystery films
German mystery films
1930s German-language films
Films directed by Mario Bonnard
Films directed by Luis Trenker
Films set in the Alps
Mountaineering films
German multilingual films
Skiing films
German black-and-white films
Films with screenplays by Franz Schulz
1930 multilingual films
1930s German films